"Flying Machine" is a song by British singer Cliff Richard, released as a single in June 1971. It peaked at number 37 on the UK Singles Chart, becoming Richard's first UK single to not make the Top 30.

Release
"Flying Machine" was written by Norwegian musician Georg Kajanus (then known as Georg Hultgreen), who had been a member of folk rock band Eclection and who would go on to be the lead singer of Sailor. He recorded a demo version on acetate, which Richard listened to and recorded his version in March 1971. It was arranged by and features the orchestra of Norrie Paramor. Hultgreen also features on Richard's version playing the flute. It was released as a single with the B-side "Pigeon", which was written by Guy Fletcher and Doug Flett and features the Nick Ingman Orchestra.

Hultgreen recorded his own proper version in 1972 as part of Kajanus Pickett (with Phil Pickett), which was released on their sole album Hi Ho SIlver!. His original demo version was later released on the 2006 album Kajanus (Revealed).

Track listing
7": Columbia / DB 8797
 "Flying Machine" – 3:02
 "Pigeon" – 2:45

Personnel
 Cliff RIchard – vocals
 Georg Hultgreen – flute
 Big Jim Sullivan – guitar
 Norrie Paramor Orchestra – all other instrumentation

Charts

References

Cliff Richard songs
1971 singles
1971 songs
Columbia Graphophone Company singles
Song recordings produced by Norrie Paramor